Fürstlich Castell'sche Bank is the third-oldest bank in continuous operation in Germany, founded in 1774 as the Gräflich Castell-Remlingen'sche Landes-Credit-Cassa. It is located in Würzburg.

In March 2016 they planned to open the third asset management fund in the third quarter to meet the customers' expectations.

References 

Article contains translated text from Fürstlich Castell’sche Bank on the German Wikipedia retrieved on 12 July 2017.

External links 
Homepage

Banks of Germany
Banks established in 1774
18th-century establishments in the Holy Roman Empire